Hemistola is a genus of moth in the family Geometridae.

Species
Species include:
Hemistola aetherea Debauche, 1937
Hemistola chrysoprasaria Esper, 1794
Hemistola ereuthopeza Prout, 1925
Hemistola flavitincta (Warren, 1897)
Hemistola hypnopoea Prout, 1926
Hemistola incommoda Prout, 1912
Hemistola kezukai Inoue, 1978
Hemistola liliana (Swinhoe, 1892)
Hemistola monotona Inoue, 1983
Hemistola orbiculosa Inoue, 1978
Hemistola semialbida Prout, 1912
Hemistola simplex Warren, 1899
Hemistola tenuilinea (Alpheraky, 1897)

References

Natural History Museum Lepidoptera genus database
 afromoths.net

Hemitheini